Mark Kirchner (born October 19, 1959) is a former American football guard and tackle. He played for the Pittsburgh Steelers and Kansas City Chiefs in 1983 and for the Indianapolis Colts in 1984-1986.

References

1959 births
Living people
American football offensive guards
American football offensive tackles
Baylor Bears football players
Pittsburgh Steelers players
Kansas City Chiefs players
Indianapolis Colts players